Dalarna County in Sweden held a regional council election on 9 September 2018 on the same day as the general and municipal elections.

Results
The number of seats remained at 83 with the Social Democrats winning the most at 24, a drop of five from in 2014. The party declined from 34.2% to 28.6% of the popular vote.

Municipalities

Images

References

Elections in Dalarna County
Dalarna